Unnatural Causes may refer to:

Manner of death (unnatural causes)
Unnatural Causes (detective novel), 1967 detective novel by P. D. James.
Unnatural Causes (1986 film), American television film
Unnatural Causes (1993 film), British television film
Unnatural Causes (TV series), 1986 British television anthology series 
 Unnatural Causes: Is Inequality Making Us Sick?, 2008 American documentary  
Clean Break (film), 2008 American film released in Europe as Unnatural Causes
Unnatural Causes, a song by Dublin Death Patrol from DDP 4 Life